Naphthylamine can refer to either of two isomeric chemical compounds:
1-Naphthylamine
2-Naphthylamine